Pseudochazara thelephassa, the Baluchi rockbrown, is a species of butterfly in the family Nymphalidae. It is found in Turkey (Adana, Adıyaman, Bingöl, Diyarbakır, Elazığ, Gaziantep, Hakkari, Hatay, İzmir, Kars, Malatya, Kahramanmaraş, Mardin, Nevşehir, Siirt, Tunceli, Urfa, Şırnak, Iğdır) to Asia Minor across Iran, Iraq, Transcaucasia and Kopet-Dagh to Afghanistan and Pakistan.

Flight period 
The species is univoltine and is on wing from April to July.

Food plants
Larvae feed on grasses.

References

 Satyrinae of the Western Palearctic - Pseudochazara thelephassa

Pseudochazara
Butterflies described in 1827